Mauro Mendonça Filho (Rio de Janeiro, August 8, 1965) is a Brazilian television director. He is the son of actors Rosamaria Murtinho and Mauro Mendonça.

References

Bibliography 
 Sérgio, Renato. Mauro Mendonça: em busca da perfeição (2009).

Brazilian television directors
1965 births
Living people
People from Rio de Janeiro (city)